Åbo IFK (or ÅIFK for short) is a sports club from Turku, Finland. The club was founded in 1908, and originally represented the Swedish-speaking minority of Turku/Åbo.

Background
The greatest successes of ÅIFK have come in football where it has won three Finnish championship titles, in 1910, 1920 and 1924. It has played a total of 9 seasons in the Finnish premier division Mestaruussarja, the last occasion in 1967. It also won the Finnish Cup in 1965 and participated in the UEFA Cup Winners' Cup in the 1966–67 season, going out in the first round. Currently the ÅIFK football team is playing in the third tier Kakkonen.

ÅIFK has also fared well in handball with both its men's and women's teams playing at the national top level at the moment.

Currently the club has activities in football, handball, athletics and bowling.

The highest ever attendance for a ÅIFK match was in 1967 when 5,861 people attended the home game with Turun Palloseura.

Football honours
Finnish Championship:
Winners (3): 1910, 1920, 1924
Runners-up (5): 1911, 1913, 1915, 1916, 1917
Finnish Cup:
Winners (1): 1965 (ÅIFK – TPS 1–0)

Divisional movements since 1930
Top Level (9 seasons):   1930, 1932–35, 1963–65, 1967
Second Level (13 seasons):   1931, 1936, 1938–39, 1943/44-45, 1961–62, 1966, 1968–70, 2000
Third Level (34 seasons):   1937, 1940–1941, 1945–1949, 1952, 1954–1960, 1971, 1986, 1988–89, 1991, 1994–96, 1998–99, 2001, 2008–2015
Fourth Level (31 seasons) :   1950–1951, 1953, 1972–1982, 1985, 1987, 1990, 1992–1993, 1997, 2002–2007, 2016 to current
Fifth Level (2 seasons) :   1983-1984

Season to season

9 season in Mestaruussarja
13 season in Ykkönen
34 seasons in Kakkonen
31 seasons in Kolmonen
2 seasons in Nelonen

Club structure
ÅIFK runs 2 men's teams, 1 veteran's teams, 7 boys teams, 1 ladies team, 4 girls teams and a Footballschool for girls.

2010 season
For the current season Åbo IFK are competing in Section B of the Kakkonen. This is the third tier of the Finnish football system. In 2009 the team finished in ninth position in their Kakkonen section.

Åbo IFK 2 are participating in the Nelonen administered by the Turku SPL. This team has taken over a club called Goose Park Rangers FC that competed at this level in 2009.

Åbo IFK 3 are competing in the Vitonen administered by the Turku SPL. Last season Åbo IFK 2 were promoted to this level from the Kutonen.

References

External links
Official website 
 Suomen Cup

Football clubs in Finland
Sport in Turku
Association football clubs established in 1908
Bandy clubs established in 1908
1908 establishments in Finland
Defunct bandy clubs in Finland
Multi-sport clubs in Finland
Swedish-speaking population of Finland